Statistics of Bulgarian Republic Football Championship in the 1945 season.

Overview
It was contested by 24 teams, and Lokomotiv Sofia won the championship. As Bulgaria had lost the territories of Vardar Macedonia, Western Thrace and parts of Greek Macedonia that it administered during most of World War II, teams from those regions no longer took part in the Bulgarian championships, beginning in 1945.

First round

|-
!colspan="3" style="background-color:#D0F0C0; text-align:left;" |Replay

|}

Second round

|}

Quarter-finals

|-
!colspan="3" style="background-color:#D0F0C0; text-align:left;" |Replay

|}

Semi-finals

|}

Final

First game

Second game

Lokomotiv Sofia won 4–2 on aggregate.

References
Bulgaria - List of final tables (RSSSF)

Bulgarian Republic Football Championship seasons
1
1